This is name of places and things named for Chief Justice John Marshall:

John Marshall House in Richmond, Virginia
John Marshall commemorative dollar
Marshall, Illinois
Marshall Township, Allegheny County, Pennsylvania.
Marshall County, Alabama
Marshall County, Illinois
Marshall County, Indiana
Marshall County, Iowa
Marshall County, Kentucky
Marshall County, Mississippi
Marshall County, Tennessee
Marshall County, West Virginia 
The Marshall-Wythe School of Law at the College of William and Mary in Williamsburg, Virginia
Franklin and Marshall College in Lancaster, Pennsylvania
Marshall University in Huntington, West Virginia
Marshall University Graduate College in South Charleston, West Virginia
John Marshall Law School (Chicago) in Chicago, Illinois
John Marshall Law School (Atlanta) in Atlanta, Georgia
John Marshall Library  a branch of the Fairfax County Public Library
John Marshall High School  in Oklahoma City
John Marshall High School (West Virginia) in Glen Dale, West Virginia, serving most of Marshall County, West Virginia
John Marshall High School in Richmond, Virginia (the original stood from 1909 until 1960, when the current school was completed)
John Marshall High School (Los Angeles) in the Los Angeles Unified School District of Los Angeles, California
John Marshall High School (Leon Valley, Texas) in Leon Valley, Texas (San Antonio address)
John Marshall High School (Minnesota) in the Independent School District #535 of Rochester, Minnesota
John Marshall High School (New York) in Rochester, New York
John Marshall High School (Cleveland, Ohio) in Cleveland, Ohio
John Marshall Metropolitan High School in Chicago, Illinois
John Marshall High School in the Seattle School District of Seattle, Washington
John Marshall High School in Bend, Oregon
John Marshall High School (Wisconsin) in Milwaukee, Wisconsin
John Marshall Elementary School in Philadelphia, Pa
John Marshall Elementary School in Scranton, Pa
John Marshall Elementary School in Edison, NJ
John Marshall Elementary School in Elizabeth, NJ
John Marshall Elementary School in Wausau, WI

References

Lists of places in the United States
Lists of things named after people
Lists of places named after people
List